The Danger Rider is a 1924 American silent film directed by Denver Dixon, and starring Art Mix, Virginia Warwick and Dorothy Lee. It premiered on September 29, 1924, in Linton, Indiana.

Cast list
 Art Mix
 Virginia Warwick
 Dorothy Lee
 Harry Tenbrook
 Dick La Reno

References

American silent films
American black-and-white films
Films directed by Victor Adamson
1920s American films